Marcos Roberto Nascimento da Silva (born 20 March 1981 in Barreiros, Pernambuco, Brazil), usually known as Marcos Tamandaré, is a Brazilian football coach and former player who played as a right back. He is the current head coach of Salgueiro.

External links

 Globo Esporte
 Brazilian Football Confederation BID

1981 births
Living people
Association football defenders
Brazilian footballers
Brazilian expatriate footballers
Expatriate footballers in Romania
Brazilian expatriate sportspeople in Romania
Ypiranga Futebol Clube players
Coritiba Foot Ball Club players
Sport Club do Recife players
Fortaleza Esporte Clube
Rio Branco Esporte Clube players
Agremiação Sportiva Arapiraquense players
Macaé Esporte Futebol Clube players
Sport Club Corinthians Paulista players
Campeonato Brasileiro Série A players
Campeonato Brasileiro Série B players
Campeonato Brasileiro Série C players
Campeonato Brasileiro Série D players
Liga I players
FC Rapid București players
Brazilian football managers
Salgueiro Atlético Clube managers